Gregory Tristan "Tris" Imboden (born July 27, 1951) is an American rock and jazz drummer.  As a performer, he has been in studio sessions and on tour with some of the most notable and highest-selling musicians of all time. He was the drummer for the multi-platinum band Chicago from 1990 to 2018. He is a multi-platinum selling artist. As an educator, he has been a drum clinician and author of tutorial materials.

Some of Imboden's most notable work include recordings with Neil Diamond, Kenny Loggins, Firefall, Richard Marx, Steve Vai, Roger Daltrey, Crosby, Stills & Nash, Chicago, Anita Baker, Julio Iglesias and Stevie Wonder.

In addition he has toured the world with rock and jazz acts such as Kenny Loggins, Al Jarreau, Chaka Khan, Firefall, Cock Robin, Michael McDonald, Chicago, and other notable groups.

As a full-time band member, Imboden's career has included Honk, the Kenny Loggins Band (including "Who's Right, Who's Wrong" featuring Michael Jackson, the six-time platinum Number One hit "Footloose", and "I'm Alright" from Caddyshack), and Chicago.  His career with Chicago has seen the release of thirteen albums, several of them certified as platinum.

Biography
Aside from a brief, early, move to Germany, Tris Imboden was raised in various beachside communities of Orange County in Southern California. As a primarily self-taught, lifetime career musician, his musical interests were stirred by seeing a parade when he was five years old.

His formal training began from grade school; and until there was an available position in the percussion section of the school band, he drummed at home on a practice pad and studied basic music theory on the trumpet at school.  He ultimately reached the position of second chair trumpeter before switching to the then-available percussion section in junior high school. He currently resides in Malibu, California and on the island of Kauai, Hawai'i, where he is an avid surfer.

Career
Imboden began his adolescent career in various surf bands, and then achieved professional status in a high school band called The Other Half.  The band performed at venues ranging from sock hops to Hollywood's venerable Teenage Fair, where Imboden said their popularity "clogged the whole entrance". Out of Newport Harbor High School, Imboden cofounded Honk in 1970. After recording some demo songs, the band's first album was the soundtrack for the surf movie Five Summer Stories, crediting Imboden as composer, producer, drummer, harmonica player, and vocalist.  Imboden established a career trend, ultimately lasting through to Chicago, of occasionally being featured on harmonica.  The song "Pipeline Sequence" reached No. 1 on Hawai'i radio. Being a member of Honk provided Imboden with formative future career experience as the band built their studio recording skills, their touring skills, and innumerable industry contacts.  They worked with bands which would eventually serve as Imboden's future professional base, by touring with Loggins and Messina, Jackson Browne, and The Beach Boys—and by opening Chicago's concerts. Honk went on hiatus from 1976 to 1986, when they established a tradition of periodic reunion concerts in their original home area of Southern California, as band members' schedules permit.

From 1977 to 1986, Imboden became a full-time recording and touring member of the Kenny Loggins Band, and then would do part-time work with them until 1989, for a total of 12 years of collaboration.  During his full-time tenure there, he composed and performed the drum set arrangements for popular 1980s motion picture soundtracks: Caddyshack and Footloose.

From the end of his full-time duration with Kenny Loggins in 1986, until 1989, Imboden's career became a full-time composite of various part-time session recordings and live performances with various groups.  His consistent work throughout that entire duration included the following: part-time work with Kenny Loggins; stage support for Grammy Award-winning jazz singer, Al Jarreau; and "Queen of Funk-Soul", Chaka Khan. In 1986, he performed drum set overdub sessions for Neil Diamond's Headed for the Future album.  This album provided a venue for Imboden's studio session collaboration with a then-member of Chicago, Bill Champlin. In 1988, he was a studio session player with former member of Chicago, bassist/lead vocalist, Peter Cetera, on Cetera's solo album titled One More Story.

In 1990, his career reshaped by joining the multi-platinum Chicago.  With the departure of founding drummer Danny Seraphine, Imboden joined the band as the full-time drummer in time for the band's 1991 release titled Twenty 1. As an integral part of Chicago for the latter half of the band's -year total career, Imboden would contribute to twelve Chicago records, and to tours alongside The Beach Boys, Earth, Wind, & Fire, and The Doobie Brothers. Since 2012, his drum set was accompanied by Chicago's newest full-time member, veteran auxiliary percussionist Walfredo Reyes, Jr. On January 17, 2018, Imboden announced his resignation from the band to focus on family time with his new wife and due to the band's schedule of touring intensely for the most of each year.

Discography

Videography

Equipment
Tris Imboden currently endorses and uses the following products:
Groove Juice Cymbal Cleaner
DW drums, hardware and pedals
Gibraltar drum racks
Remo drum heads
Paiste cymbals
Vic Firth drumsticks
Beato Bags
Latin Percussion

References

Discography sources

Videography sources

External links

Tris Imboden Interview NAMM Oral History Library (2020)

1951 births
Living people
American rock drummers
American performance artists
American male composers
American session musicians
Musicians from Orange County, California
People from Malibu, California
20th-century American composers
American harmonica players
21st-century American composers
Chicago (band) members
Firefall members
American expatriates in Germany
20th-century American drummers
American male drummers
American jazz drummers
21st-century American drummers
Jazz musicians from California
20th-century American male musicians
21st-century American male musicians
American male jazz musicians